Miu (written: 美雨, 美宇, 美優, 未生 or 海羽) is a feminine Japanese given name. Notable people with the name include:

, Japanese table tennis player
, Japanese singer
, Japanese figure skater
, Japanese pair skater
, Japanese softball left-handed

Fictional characters
 Miu Fūrinji, protagonist of the manga series Shijou Saikyou no Deshi Kenichi
 Miu Kurosaki, from the video game The King of Fighters EX
 Miu Matsuoka, from the manga series Strawberry Marshmallow (Ichigo Mashimaro)
 Miu Sutō, main character from the Japanese television series Engine Sentai Go-onger
 Miu, character appearing in the hentai series Lolita Anime
 Miu Amano, from the manga series Blend S
 Miu Owusawa, from "Aesthetica of a Rogue Hero"
 Miu Iruma, from "Danganronpa V3: Killing Harmony"
 Miu Shinoda, from the manga and anime "Nana"

  Miu, from the manga DearS
Japanese feminine given names